A referendum on the remunicipalization of the energy supply in Berlin was held on 3 November 2013. Prompted by the Neue Energie für Berlin (New Energy for Berlin) citizens' initiative in June 2013, it was approved by 83% of those who voted. However, the referendum failed due to insufficient voter turnout.  24.2% of Berlin voters voted in favor, but the quorum required 25% or more to do so.

Draft legislation
The New Energy for Berlin draft law aimed for the remunicipalization of Berlin's energy supply that was privatized in 1997, when the city of Berlin sold its municipal infrastructure and services company Bewag to the Swedish power company Vattenfall. It also demanded economically democratic control of the supply and a fast transition to 100% renewable energy.

Initiators

The referendum on New Energy for Berlin was initiated by the Berlin Energy Table, a non-partisan alliance of about 55 organizations, initiatives, and individual activists aiming for the remunicipalization of the municipal energy supply. The alliance was founded in 2011 as an open platform for all those lobbying for a socially just, ecologically sustainable, and economically democratic energy, gas, and heating supply in Berlin.

Members of the alliance include the Berlin sections of attac, BUND, People's Solidarity, the Education and Science Workers' Union (GEW) as well as community organizations for affordable housing and the left-wing initiative FelS. While being non-partisan, the alliance is supported by the federal sections of major parties such as the SPD, Alliance '90/The Greens, and Die Linke.

Course of events
Between 11 February and 10 June 2013, the initiators collected 227,748 valid signatures of Berlin citizens, around 50,000 more than necessary to qualify for a referendum (Volksbegehren).

Results

References

External links

Berliner Energietisch 

2013 referendums
Referendums in Berlin
Electric power in Germany
2013 in Berlin